The 2016–17 Nebraska Cornhuskers women's basketball team represented University of Nebraska–Lincoln during the 2016–17 NCAA Division I women's basketball season. The Cornhuskers, led by 1st year head coach Amy Williams, played their home games at Pinnacle Bank Arena and were members of the Big Ten Conference. They finished the season 7–22, 3–13 in Big Ten play to finish in a 4 way for eleventh place. They lost in the first round of the Big Ten women's tournament to Illinois.

Roster

Schedule

|-
!colspan=9 style="background: #E11D38; color: #ffffff"| Exhibition

|-
!colspan=9 style="background: #E11D38; color: #ffffff"| Non-conference regular season

|-
!colspan=9 style="background: #E11D38; color: #ffffff"| Big Ten regular season

|-
!colspan=9 style="background:#E11D38; color:#ffffff;"| Big Ten Women's Tournament

Source

Rankings
2016–17 NCAA Division I women's basketball rankings

References

External links
 Official Team Website

Nebraska Cornhuskers women's basketball seasons
Nebraska
Cornhusk
Cornhusk